Paratillus is a genus of checkered beetles in the family Cleridae. There is one described species in Paratillus, P. carus.

References

Further reading

 
 

Cleridae
Articles created by Qbugbot